This is a list of flag bearers who have represented Sweden at the Olympics.

Flag bearers carry the national flag of their country at the opening ceremony of the Olympic Games.

See also
Sweden at the Olympics

References

Sweden at the Olympics
Sweden
Olympic flagbearers